The Magdala, also known as The Magdala Tavern or colloquially as simply The Magy, is a public house on South Hill Park in Hampstead and was named after the British victory in the 1868 Battle of Magdala.

History 
The pub became infamous as the location where Ruth Ellis, the last woman to be executed in Great Britain, shot her boyfriend in 1955.

After closing for refurbishment in 2014, The Magdala reopened in January 2015 before closing again in February 2016, with the upper floors converted to flats. It reopened again as a pub and restaurant in May 2021.

The Magdala has been listed as an Asset of Community Value since September 2014. It is owned by Ori Calif.

See also 

 List of assets of community value
 Carlton Tavern (owned by same landlord)

References

External links
 
 

Buildings and structures in Hampstead
Pubs in the London Borough of Camden